Arthur Moyse (21 June 1914 – 22 February 2003) was an Anglo-Irish anarchist, artist and writer.

Biography
In his youth he was actively involved in political activity including the battle of Cable Street in 1936. He also saw active service in World War Two, including the airborne landings at Arnhem in 1944, but he was court-martialled twice for insubordination.

Publications
 Fragments of Notes for an Autobiography
 Golden Convolvulus
 The Mask of Anarchy (Illustrations from Arthur Moyse)
 More in Sorrow: Six Short Stories
 Surrealism and Revolution (with Jim Duke)

See also
 Anarchism and the arts
 Surrealism

References

External links 
 We Make Zines Blog discussing Arthur Moyse

Irish anarchists
1914 births
2003 deaths
People from County Wexford
Irish writers
Irish artists